Robert Gibson (born February 2, 1986 in Kingston, Ontario) is a Canadian rower.

In 2004, he was the Canadian Indoor Rowing Champion and became the Canadian High School Rowing champion in the Mens 2- with partner Will Crothers. He also earned a scholarship to attend the University of Washington and won a bronze medal at the Junior World Rowing Championships in the Mens coxed 4+.

He was officially named as the alternate to the 2008, Beijing Olympics Gold Medal Winning Mens 8+.

He won a silver medal at the 2012 Summer Olympics in the men's eight with Gabriel Bergen, Andrew Byrnes, Jeremiah Brown, Will Crothers, Douglas Csima, Malcolm Howard, Conlin McCabe and Brian Price.

He was a recipient of the Queen Elizabeth II Diamond Jubilee Medal in 2012.
He was a recipient of the official 'Key to the City of Kingston' in 2012, along with fellow Kingstonian Olympic Athletes Will Crothers and Dylan Wykes.

At the 2015, Pan-Am Games he won a gold medal in the Mens Quad 4x as well as a silver medal in the Mens Single 1x.

In June 2016, he was officially named to Canada's 2016 Olympic team in the Mens 4X finishing 8th.

References

External links
 

1986 births
Canadian male rowers
Living people
Medalists at the 2012 Summer Olympics
Olympic rowers of Canada
Olympic medalists in rowing
Olympic silver medalists for Canada
Rowers at the 2012 Summer Olympics
Rowers from Ontario
Sportspeople from Kingston, Ontario
University of Washington alumni
Rowers at the 2015 Pan American Games
World Rowing Championships medalists for Canada
Pan American Games gold medalists for Canada
Pan American Games silver medalists for Canada
Rowers at the 2016 Summer Olympics
Pan American Games medalists in rowing
Medalists at the 2015 Pan American Games